HMS Kandahar (F28) was a K-class destroyer built for the Royal Navy during the 1930s, named after the Afghan city of Kandahar.

Description
The K-class destroyers were repeats of the preceding J class, except that they were not fitted for minesweeping gear. They were powered by Parsons geared steam turbines, each driving one propeller shaft, using steam provided by two Admiralty three-drum boilers. The ship's complement was 183 officers and men.

The ships were armed with six 4.7-inch (120 mm) Mark XII guns in twin mounts, two superfiring in front of the bridge and one aft of the superstructure. For anti-aircraft (AA) defence, they had one quadruple mount for 2-pounder "pom-pom" guns and two quadruple mounts for the 0.5 inch Vickers Mark III anti-aircraft machinegun. The K-class ships were fitted with two above-water quintuple mounts for  torpedoes. The ship was fitted with two depth charge throwers and one rack for 20 depth charges.

Construction and career
Kandahar was launched on 21 March 1939. On 19 December 1941, she was part of British Force K, tasked to intercept an Italian convoy bound for Tripoli when she was irreparably damaged by a newly laid Italian mine whilst attempting to rescue the stricken cruiser . She was scuttled the next day by the destroyer . 73 men went down with the ship.

Notes

References

External links
 HMS Neptune Association, includes information on the sinking of HMS Kandahar

 

J, K and N-class destroyers of the Royal Navy
Ships built on the River Clyde
1939 ships
World War II destroyers of the United Kingdom
World War II shipwrecks in the Mediterranean Sea
Maritime incidents in December 1941
Ships sunk by mines